St. Nicholas' Church is a parish of the Roman Catholic Church in the city of Volgograd, within the Diocese of St. Clement at Saratov in Russia.

History
The church was built in 1899 in the neo-Gothic style, with a topped tower with a spire and side chapels dedicated to the Virgin Mary and St. Stanislaus.

Amidst anti-religious persecution, the church was closed by the Soviet authorities in 1930, looted and vandalized. It became a school in 1935 and then a meeting room. It was so damaged by the 1980s that it was set for demolition. After the Catholic Church in Volgograd (formerly Stalingrad) was recognized again officially in August 1991, Catholics returned six months later. Restoration of the church lasted more than five years.

Today it collaborates with the parish Caritas organization, the Pope John XXIII Association, and the Norbertine nuns.

See also
Catholic Church in Russia

References

Buildings and structures in Volgograd
Roman Catholic churches completed in 1899
Gothic Revival church buildings in Russia
19th-century Roman Catholic church buildings in Russia
Cultural heritage monuments of regional significance in Volgograd Oblast